The Lance Todd Trophy is a trophy in rugby league, awarded to the annual Challenge Cup Final's man of the match. Introduced in 1945–46, the trophy was named in memory of Lance Todd, the New Zealand-born player and administrator, who was killed in a road accident during the Second World War. After Todd's death a fund, the Lance Todd memorial Trophy Fund, was established by Australian journalist and rugby league official Harry Sunderland.  The trophy's winner is selected by the members of the Rugby League Writers' Association present at the game. Until 1957 there was no permanent trophy, instead the winner was given a cash prize with which to buy themselves a memento.  In 1956 the Red Devils Association, the official body representing ex-Salford players, decided to pay for a permanent trophy to be awarded to the winner and the first recipient of the new trophy was Jeff Stevenson in 1957. The trophy is presented at a celebratory dinner at the AJ Bell Stadium, home of the Salford Red Devils although as of 2019 no Salford player has won this award.

The first winner of the trophy was Wakefield Trinity , Billy Stott in 1945–46. St. Helens' Sean Long made history in 2006 becoming the first player to win the Lance Todd Trophy three times, having won in 2001 and 2004. Five players have won the trophy twice: Warrington's Gerry Helme in 1949–50 and 1953–54; Wigan's Andy Gregory in 1987–88 and 1989–90; and Martin Offiah in 1991–92 and 1993–94; St. Helens' Paul Wellens in 2007 (jointly) and 2008; Hull FC's Marc Sneyd in 2016 and 2017. Sneyd and Wellens are the only players to win the award in consecutive finals.

Halifax's former Australian international fullback Graham Eadie and Wigan's 1984-85 Australian import stand-off Brett Kenny are the only players to win both the Lance Todd Trophy and the Clive Churchill Medal as the player of the match in the Sydney Premiership Grand Final. Eadie won the Lance Todd in 1986–87 and was (retrospectively) twice awarded the Churchill after Manly-Warringah's premiership wins in 1976 and 1978 while 1984–85 trophy winner Kenny was retrospectively awarded the Churchill for Parramatta's Grand Final wins in 1982 and 1983.

The first player to win the trophy on the losing side was Frank Whitcombe of Bradford Northern in the 1947–48 final against Wigan. he was also the first forward to win the award. Robbie Paul, Gary Connolly, Kevin Sinfield and Niall Evalds have all won the award since 1996, despite each of them finishing on the losing side.

The youngest player to win the trophy was Huddersfield's Peter Ramsden who, on his 19th birthday, won it in 1952–53.

The trophy has been shared on two occasions, in 1964–65 by Ray Ashby (Wigan) & Brian Gabbitas (Hunslet), and in 2007 by Wellens and Leon Pryce.

Winners

† = Won Lance Todd Trophy whilst on losing team

Awards by club

Winners by playing position

See also
Harry Sunderland Trophy
Man of Steel Award
Clive Churchill Medal

References

 Lance Todd Wigan Career Page on the Wigan RL Fansite.

Challenge Cup finals
Rugby league trophies and awards